Onay is a village in Helmand Province, in southwestern Afghanistan.

See also
 Helmand Province

References

Populated places in Helmand Province